Dumarce Lake is a natural lake in South Dakota, in the United States.

Dumarce Lake has the name of a local Native American family.

See also
List of lakes in South Dakota

References

Lakes of South Dakota
Lakes of Marshall County, South Dakota